Georgia Ellinaki (born February 28, 1974) is a female Greek water polo player and Olympic silver medalist with the Greece women's national water polo team.

She received a silver medal at the 2004 Summer Olympics in Athens.

See also
 Greece women's Olympic water polo team records and statistics
 List of Olympic medalists in water polo (women)
 List of women's Olympic water polo tournament goalkeepers

References

External links

1974 births
Living people
Greek female water polo players
Water polo goalkeepers
Olympic water polo players of Greece
Water polo players at the 2004 Summer Olympics
Water polo players at the 2008 Summer Olympics
Olympic silver medalists for Greece
Olympic medalists in water polo
Medalists at the 2004 Summer Olympics
Water polo players from Athens
21st-century Greek women